The A 32 road is an A-Grade trunk road in Sri Lanka. It connects Mannar with Navatkuli.

The A 32 passes through Thirukethiswaram, Pallamadu, Illupaikadavai, Vellankulam, Pallavarayankattu, Chunnavil, Pooneryn and Arukuveli to reach Navatkuli.

References

Highways in Sri Lanka
Transport in Jaffna District
Transport in Kilinochchi District
Transport in Mannar District